is a manga series created by the former CLAMP member, Tamayo Akiyama. It is about an eight-grade girl named Rune Ayanokouji, who is destined to save the world from peril caused by notorious cyber-alien beings.

Plot
Rune lives with her mad scientist grandfather, who is very smart, but has a habit of dressing her up in weird cosplay outfits.
Rune was born with a sun-like crest on her wrist (known as the Crest of the Sun), and was told by her grandfather that she was the reincarnated Space Queen. Rune refuses to believe almost anything her grandfather says and tries to live a normal life, despite the fact that she works part-time as a cybernetic superhuman to ward off alien beings that have invaded the earth. Rune's childhood friends, Masaya and Masato Ibayashi, are also cybernetic warriors who bear the Crest of the Sun, but she doesn't know this until later in volume one. It is also revealed that her other close friend, Aina Hazumi, is also a Crest-bearer.

A horde of cybernetic aliens hail from Planet X to dominate the earth, and they ensure that their plans are carried out successfully. Many of them are disguised as humans in order to conceal their identities. These alien forces are under the command of Emperor Gald, the mastermind behind the domination of Earth. In the beginning of the series, Gald is "asleep"—he hasn't been awakened to his full power yet. During this time, the aliens are trying to revive him so that he can lead them to their victory.

There are five certain objects needed in order to destroy the aliens' operation. These are the six Elements of the Sun. Each piece resembles one part of Sun Crest (five points and a central core). Each one must be obtained before the aliens are able to steal them.
In the meantime, another trio of aliens arrive on earth from Planet X. It turns out they're actually on a mission to protect Rune and defeat the evil horde of aliens. They disguise themselves as humans and go along with pseudonyms. Rune happens to befriend one of these aliens, but doesn't know that he is undergoing an important mission.

Characters 

Rune Ayanokouji The heroine of the story. She hates the way her grandfather acts, and wakes up almost every morning dressed in strange cosplay outfits. She is a bearer of the Sun Crest, and is told that she is the reincarnation of the Space Queen. She has a part-time job of fighting aliens with a Veena-Alpha battlesuit. One day, she comes across a cute pink creature, and decides to name him Chat-kun, and brings him home with her.

Masaya and Masato Ibayashi These are the two twin brothers in the story. Masaya is the older twin, and the one who pilots the powerful Beta-Max powersuit while fighting off aliens. After a malfunction with Beta-Max, he and his younger twin, Masato decide to take turns piloting the powersuit. They are also Rune's childhood friends and classmates. These two also bear the Crest of the Sun on their wrists. In volume three, it is revealed that Masato is a clone of Masaya, and in volume four, it reveals that the Space Queen hid her DNA inside of Masato's body.

Aina Hazumi Rune's female friend and classmate. She is an expert at using Tarot cards and tries to convince Rune about the problems of the real world, even though it seems Rune isn't interested in them. She is revealed to bear the Crest of the Sun on her ankle in volume two.

Chat-Kun This is the pink, blobby little creature in the story. He has the Sun Crest on his belly. Although he nearly always makes the sound "cha!" he also makes other unusual sounds such as "puni" and "mii".

Professor Ayanokouji Rune's grandfather, a smart, but bizarre scientist. He's the one who analyzes and calculates things, as well as dresses Rune up in strange Space Queen cosplay outfits each morning.

Professor Ibayashi The scientist father of Masaya and Masato. He's been quite competitive against Professor Ayanokouji, even though they've been lab partners and friends many years ago.

Quark This is the alien that arrived from Planet X to Earth to find and protect the Space Queen. He is a strong, alien warrior and he fights with a neutrino saber. He and his two companions all transformed into humans as part of their mission on Earth. However, due to a malfunction in the transformation device they used, Quark turned into a female human instead of male. As he goes on with his mission, he seems to care much about it, and takes on the pseudonym, Akira Shingyoji. After saving Rune from an explosion, Rune befriends Akira, totally unaware of his true identity. Akira attends Rune's junior high school as a student in disguise, to ensure the safety of Rune.

Gluon He is one of Quark's dependable companions. After activating the transformation device, he turned into a male human. He helps keep watch over the evil aliens to make sure their plans to dominate Earth don't progress. He takes the pseudonym Seiji.

Plasma He is yet another one of Quark's companions, and also keeps check over the aliens. He too, turned into a male human. He takes the pseudonym Keiichi.

Noema and Noeshisu These two are the cat-like cybernoids that have stolen the secret "numbers" to activate a grand summoning system. They  seem to be making a lot of progress, but nobody in the alien Empire seems to think much of them.

Delta-Chronos He is one of the Empire's top cybernoid aliens, and is very tough. However, after leaving Akira for dead in volume three, Rune defeats him. He returns in volume four.

Thunder-Mu She is the Empire's toughest female cybernoid alien. She was supposed to collect an Elemental piece from Rune and her friends in volume two, thus failing, and being destroyed by Chat-kun.

Grand Wizard Fractal He is the old man who is part of the Empire and keeps watch over the evil aliens' steady progress to ensure that nothing interferes with it.

Ishtar She is the programmed girl who the Empire needs to awaken many alien comrades, all of whom are hiding among human DNA. In volume three, Ishtar is the user of VR City, which simulates the Ishtar System, which is revealed to be on Planet X in volume four. Ishtar is also a computer virus.

Emperor Gald He is the leader of the Empire and the boss that has been hiding in a physical human body since the aliens failed their last invasion a decade ago. He is awakened and summoned in volume two, and begins to wreak havoc in VR City in volume three. In volume four, it is revealed that he is a neural network and the Space Queen's true love.

The Space Queen The ruler of all the cosmos, with her great will and power. With the Crest of the Sun on both wrists, she chose six "warriors" to fight the evil aliens. Her secrets are revealed in volume four.

Aurora Aurora is another alien from Planet X. She is a scientist and has been called to travel to Earth and fix the damaged transformation device that Gluon, Plasma, and Quark used. It is revealed in volume four that she and Quark are genetic siblings.

Cybernetic Units 
The Cybernetic suit and units in the series are Alpha, Beta, Gamma, PSI, Zeta, and Omega. The alpha unit appears to be used mostly by females such as Rune, whereas the beta unit appears to be used mostly by males, like Masaya and Masato. The other letters of the alphabet shown up in volume four during the final invasion. Quark's cybernoid is an early model of Zeta-Omega. Due to Quark being a clone of Emperor Gald, Gald is also under the Zeta-Omega unit, which explains why Quark would have died after entering Gald's net.

The Ishtar System 
This is the virtual city that entraps, Rune, Quark, Aurora, Masaya, Masato, and the Student Council. The member of the school's Student Council created this network. The aliens betrayed them and sent them into the city. They all try to work their way to the "exit". Ishtar is the user controlling the city. Throughout the city, monstrous creatures known as VR City Hunters pop up and attack. When Rune gets attacked by a Hunter, Quark shows up and saves her. However, Rune gets taken away by Ishtar and nearly dies from the senses of the Ishtar System. She is then stuck in an empty space in which she meets the Space Queen. The Student Council members later come across an area known as the "perception space", which draws from a person's subconsciousness and presents them with their strongest emotions. The lead member of the Student Council gets lost and she meets up with Masaya, who later finds out that Masato is a clone. Soon afterward, Rune is revived, and she and Quark battle against the forces of the Ishtar System, and everyone trapped inside the net are finally able to escape.

The Six Warriors 
The Space chose six people from Earth to fight the newly awakened Gald. She made them each bear the Crest of the Sun. In volume one, Rune bore the Crest on her wrist. Masaya had borne it on his right wrist, and Masato had it marked on his left wrist. In volume two, Aina revealed to have the Crest on her ankle. In volume four, it revealed amidst the battle that Quark had the Crest on it wrist, then later revealed that Chat-kun was also a "chosen one", due to the Crest on his belly.

The Truth About Gald and the Space Queen 
According to book four, Gald was a program created by the Space Queen, who was able to sneak some of his DNA and transform him into a human being with it. The Space Queen fell deeply in love with Gald, which created Ishtar, who is merely the Space Queen's feelings. Ishtar became a virus and made Gald powerful. After the failure of the last invasion decades ago, the Space Queen sent a message to ordinary people of the Earth, including Rune's grandfather, and they have all responded. The Space Queen then chose warriors to fight and defeat the invasion. Just as she puts an end to the battle, she tells Rune to help transform Ishtar. Ishtar becomes a baby human. Gald completely changes and assures the Space Queen that he will raise and protect Ishtar, as well as protect the Earth from future peril.

The Six Elements 
According to volume two, the six Elements together resemble the Crest of the Sun. The Core makes up the center and is the most important part, while the five Elemental spokes surround it, supporting it with power. Each of the chosen warriors make up the Elements, Rune being the Core, and the Elements are needed to start the Great Attractor by the aliens. The heroes must collect all the Elemental pieces in order to prevent them from falling into the aliens' hands.
There are, of course, six characters who bear the crests: Rune, Masaya, Masato, Aina, Quark, and Chat-kun.

Comedy anime and manga
Science fiction anime and manga
Tamayo Akiyama
Tokyopop titles
Shōjo manga
Kadokawa Shoten manga